The 2019 South American Artistic Gymnastics Championships was held in Santiago, Chile, from June 18 to 23, 2019. The competition was organized by the Chilean Gymnastics Federation and approved by the International Gymnastics Federation.

Participating nations

Medalists

Medal table

References

South American Artistic Gymnastics Championships, 2019
South American Gymnastics Championships
International gymnastics competitions hosted by Chile
2019 in Chilean sport
South American Artistic Gymnastics Championships